Shams-ol-Emareh is one of Tehran’s historical buildings and a remnant of Qajar dynasty. It is one of the most prominent buildings on the east side of Golestan Palace. It was built around 1830. It is notable for its height, decorations and design.

Shams-ol-Emareh is 35 meters tall with five floors. It was the tallest building in Tehran when it was built, and the first building using metal in its structure. All the pillars in the upper floors are of cast iron. Shams-ol-Emareh was the symbol of Tehran before Sar dar Baghe Melli was built.

History 

Before his visit to Europe, Naser al-Din Shah Qajar, the fourth king of Qajar dynasty, was thinking of building a mansion in his capital to compete with Isfahan’s Ālī Qāpū. A tall building that he could stand on its roof and see the entire Tehran. By his order, Shams-ol-Emareh building was started in 1865 and was finished in two years. Naser al-Din Shah took his guests to the roof of this building to see the capital. The building’s designer was Moayer al Mamalek and the architecture was Ali Mohammed Kashi. The style of this building is a combination of traditional Iranian and Western architecture.

The Ministers’ Door 

Qajar ministers used to take their cabinet meetings in this building. Cabinet members would enter or leave from a particular door so it acquired the name "the Ministers’ Door". The Prime Minister's carriage, with its seven guards, always stopped in front of this door. This is the only door that its Qajar style façade remains.

Style 
The building has two towers in the same shape. Tiling and windows are Iranian style partly derived from western architecture.

ًRooms 
First floor contains the king's porch and hall covered with excellent and minimalist mirroring, with rooms on the sides which together resemble ear rings on a human ‘s face. All parts have interesting decorations. These little rooms, with reticular decorations, drawings and mirroring, also can be seen on other floors.

Decorations 

The floor of the king’s porch and façade are decorated with seven color tiling in the Qajar style. The tiling shows drawings from Europe’s nature and western architecture, but the style is Iranian. 
Pillars’ marble bases are decorated with highlighted motifs of plants and animals faces. It seems these motifs belong to different epochs.

The clock of Shams-ol-Emareh  
This clock was a present to Naser al-Din Shah's palace from Queen Victoria of the United Kingdom. The same palace which was built in European style and was distinguished among all buildings adjacent to Golestan Palace. The clock was mounted on top of Shams-ol-Emareh so as to inform people of the then small Tehran, of the local time. The loud sound of the clock, however, caused the palace residents to complain which in turn made the Shah to order tone down the sound. The repair work on the clock, however, did not do any good and resulted in the clock to go silent. The clock remained silent for over a hundred years. This silence finally ended on 12 November 2012 after new repairs were completed. The clock bell sounded again.

Repairs 
Shams-ol-Emareh went through a period of repairs which ended in Repairs and maintenance of was finished in 1997. In 1999 the ground floor was opened to the public.

References

External links

Palaces in Tehran
Palaces in Iran
Royal residences in Iran
Museums in Tehran
Persian gardens in Iran
World Heritage Sites in Iran
Historic house museums in Iran
19th-century establishments in Iran
Buildings of the Qajar period